Arthur William Devenish Meares, also known as Arthur William Devenish-Meares or "Newry" Meares (1874–1935) was an Irish rugby union player who won four caps for Ireland and two for the British Isles.

Meares was a part of the 1896 British and Irish Lions tour to South Africa, where he appeared as full back in the third and fourth test matches.

In 1899 he went on to make his Ireland debut, appearing this time as a forward against Scotland and Wales in what was a  Triple Crown winning year for the Irish team.

His final international game came against Wales in Belfast on 17 March 1900.

References

Sources
  www.irishrugby.ie
 www.scrum.com

Ireland international rugby union players
Irish rugby union players
British & Irish Lions rugby union players from Ireland
Dublin University Football Club players
1874 births
1935 deaths
Rugby union players from County Westmeath
Rugby union forwards
Rugby union fullbacks